is part of the mixed-use Bay Square complex in Yokosuka, Kanagawa Prefecture, Japan. It opened in 1994. The horseshoe-shaped theatre seats 1,806 and there is a smaller hall, the Yokosuka Bayside Pocket, with a capacity of 600. The Bay Square complex is by Kenzo Tange, with acoustical design of the halls by Nagata Acoustics.

References

External links
  Homepage
  Performances

Concert halls in Japan
Opera houses in Japan
Buildings and structures in Yokosuka, Kanagawa
Music venues completed in 1994
1994 establishments in Japan
Kenzo Tange buildings